An Unseen Enemy is a 1912 Biograph Company short silent film directed by D. W. Griffith, and was the first film to be made starring the actresses Lillian Gish and Dorothy Gish. A critic of the time stated that "the Gish sisters gave charming performances in this one-reel film". The film was shot in Fort Lee, New Jersey where early film studios in America's first motion picture industry were based at the beginning of the 20th century. Consistent with practice at that time, the actors in the cast and their roles are not listed in the film. (The car chase near the end was not filmed in Fort Lee. It began in Little Silver, NJ and ended in Oceanport, NJ, the movable Goose Neck Bridge connecting the two).

Plot
A physician's death orphans his two adolescent daughters. Their older brother is able to convert some of the doctor's small estate to cash. It is late in the day, and with the banks closed he stores the money in his father's household safe. The slatternly housekeeper, aware of the money, enlists a criminal acquaintance to help crack the safe. They lock the daughters in an adjacent room, and the drunken housekeeper menaces them by brandishing a gun through a hole in the wall. The resourceful girls use the telephone to call their brother who has returned to town. He gets the message and organizes a rescue party.

Cast
 Elmer Booth
 Lillian Gish
 Dorothy Gish
 Harry Carey Sr.
Robert Harron
Grace Henderson as The Unseen Enemy
Charles Hill Mailes 
Walter Miller
Henry B. Walthall
Adolph Lestina
Antonio Moreno as Man on Bridge, flagging car
Erich von Stroheim as Man in Straw Hat Dancing at Lobby Desk

Commentary
Lillian and Dorothy Gish play the two sisters in peril in this "race to the rescue" film. To emphasize their sisterhood, they wear identical outfits, hairstyles, and perform similar gestures. The other two films where the Gishes play sisters are The Lady and the Mouse (1913) and Orphans of the Storm (1922).

See also
 Harry Carey filmography
 D. W. Griffith filmography
 Lillian Gish filmography

References

External links

 An Unseen Enemy on YouTube

An Unseen Enemy available for free download from Archive.org

1912 films
1912 short films
American silent short films
Biograph Company films
American black-and-white films
Films shot in Fort Lee, New Jersey
Films directed by D. W. Griffith
Articles containing video clips
1910s American films